Nyctanthes arbor-tristis, also known as the  Night-flowering jasmine or Parijata (Parvati chi phula), is a species of Nyctanthes native to South Asia and Southeast Asia.

The flowers are fragrant, with a five- to eight-lobed white corolla with an orange-red centre; they are produced in clusters of two to seven together, with individual flowers opening at dusk and finishing at dawn. The fruit is a bilobed,  flat brown heart-shaped to round capsule  diameter, each lobe containing a single seed.

Despite its common name, the species is not a "true jasmine" and not of the genus Jasminum.

Names and symbolism

The tree is sometimes called the "tree of sorrow", because the flowers lose their brightness during daytime; the scientific name arbor-tristis also means "sad tree". The flowers can be used as a source of yellow dye for clothing. The flower is called Pārijāta (पारिजात) in Sanskrit, rātarāni (रातरानी, Queen of the Night) in Hindi, Gangaseuli and  Jharaa sephali in Odisha, India. In the Borok Tipruri culture, it is associated with the cycle of life, i.e., birth and dying. It is popularly used as a garland for the dead.

The flower is the official flower of the state of West Bengal, and of Kanchanaburi Province, Thailand. It is known as Parijata, Shefali and Siuli around West Bengal. Nyctanthes arbor-tristis is commonly known as night-flowering jasmine and coral jasmine. It is referred to as Har-shringaar in Bihar's Mithilanchal and Madhesh. It is called Xewālee (Xewālee, শেৱালী) in Assamese, while in Sri Lanka, it is called Sepalika (සේපාලිකා). In Karnataka it is called parijatha(ಪಾರಿಜಾತ), In Telugu it is called parijatam పారిజాతం, Kerala, where it is called Pavizhamalli (പവിഴമല്ലി) in Malayalam,  (பவழ மல்லி) in Tamil,  (पार्दक) in Konkani, prajakta (प्राजक्त) in Marathi. In Myanmar, it is called  ( :my:ဆိပ်ဖလူး ).  It is used for pujas and similar ceremonies . It also has importance in old Malayalam romantic songs.

Chemical constituents

Leaves:  The leaves contain D-mannitol, β-sitosterol, flavanol glycosides, astragalin, nicotiflorin, oleanolic acid, nyctanthic acid, tannic acid, ascorbic acid, methyl salicylate, an amorphous glycoside, an amorphous resin, trace of volatile oil, carotene, friedeline, lupeol, mannitol, glucose, fructose, iridoid glycosides, and benzoic acid.
Flowers:  The flowers contain essential oils, nyctanthin, D-mannitol, tannins, glucose, carotenoids, glycosides including β-monogentiobioside ester of α-crocetin (or crocin-3), β-monogentiobioside-β-D monoglucoside ester of α-crocetin, and β-digentiobioside ester of α-crocetin (or crocin-1).
Seeds:  The seeds contain arbortristosides A and B; glycerides of linoleic, oleic, lignoceric, stearic, palmitic and myristic acids; nyctanthic acid; 3,4-secotriterpene acid; and a water-soluble polysaccharide composed of D-glucose and D-mannose.
Bark:  The bark contains glycosides and alkaloids.
Stem:  The stems contain the glycoside naringenin-4’-0-β-glucapyranosyl-α-xylopyranoside and β-sitosterol.
Flower oil:  The flower oil contains α-pinene, p-cymene, 1-hexanol, methylheptanone, phenyl acetaldehyde, 1-decenol and anisaldehyde.
Plant:  The plant contains 2,3,4,6-tetra-0-methyl-D-glucose; 2,3,6 tri-0-methyl-D-glucose; 2,3,6-tri-0-methyl-D-mannose; 2,3,-di-0-methyl-D-mannose; arbortristosides A, B, and C; and iridoid glycosides.

Uses

Traditional Medicine
The leaves have been used in Ayurvedic medicine and Homoeopathy for sciatica, arthritis, and fevers, and as a laxative.

Literature 

The parijata is featured in Hindu literature, and is often associated with the legendary tree called the Kalpavriksha. The Mahabharata and the Puranas describe the parijata tree to have emerged during the legend of the Samudra Manthana. Krishna is described to have later battled with Indra to uproot the parijata from his capital of Amaravati and plant it in his own city of Dvaraka. In regional tradition, Satyabhama grew aggrieved when Krishna offered his chief consort Rukmini a parijata flower. To placate her envy, Krishna is described to have confronted Indra and had the parijata tree planted near her house's door. In spite of having the tree planted near her dwelling, the flowers of the tree fell in the adjacent backyard of Rukmini, the favourite wife of Krishna, because of her superior devotion and humility.

The tree is the subject of a work named Parijatapaharanamu in Telugu literature, written by Nandi Thimmana, the court-poet of Krishnadevaraya.

See also
Jasminum sambac
Tabernaemontana divaricata
Trachelospermum jasminoides

References

External links

Myxopyreae
Flora of the Indian subcontinent
Flora of Myanmar
Flora of Thailand
Flora of Yunnan
Trees in mythology
Sacred trees in Hinduism
Plants described in 1753
Taxa named by Carl Linnaeus
Symbols of West Bengal